Kildee is a surname. Notable people with the surname include:

 Dale Kildee (1929–2021), Congressman from Michigan
 Dan Kildee (born 1958), Congressman from Michigan

See also
 Gildea
 Gilday